The North Western Railway (NWR) was an early British railway company in the north-west of England. It was commonly known as the "Little" North Western Railway, to distinguish it from the larger London and North Western Railway (LNWR).

The NWR was first leased, and later taken over, by the Midland Railway (MR). The MR used part of the line for its London to Scotland Settle and Carlisle main line.

The NWR main line, which ran from Skipton in the West Riding of Yorkshire to Morecambe on the Lancashire coast, gave the MR access to the west coast in an area dominated by the rival LNWR.

Part of the line, between Lancaster and Morecambe, was used in the early twentieth century for pioneering overhead electrification.

Two-thirds of the line, in North Yorkshire, is still in use today, mainly for local services. Of the dismantled Lancashire section, two-thirds has been reused as a combined cyclepath and footpath.

Formation

There would be a branch at Clapham, Yorkshire to Lancaster, to make an end-on connection with an associated company.

Morecambe Harbour and Railway

The single-track line opened on Whit Monday 12 June 1848, a temporary station having been constructed at Morecambe which, it was reported, afforded "every possible accommodation" to passengers.

The company amalgamated with the NWR within months of its incorporation, although technically it remained a separate company until absorption by the Midland Railway on 1 June 1871.

The railway and harbour on Morecambe Bay led to the development of a settlement around them which absorbed Poulton-le-Sands, and later Bare and Torrisholme, and which eventually adopted the name of Morecambe.

Construction

However, due to economic recession, work on the Ingleton-to-Low Gill section was suspended, so the NWR was forced to concentrate on the branch to Lancaster.

A horse bus had been used to bridge the gap between Wennington and Clapham during construction.

Upon completion of the Morecambe-to-Skipton line, the Clapham-to-Ingleton section was closed, just ten months after opening, as the prospect of completion of the partly built branch to Low Gill seemed remote.

The whole line was originally single track. By 1850, the -to- section had been doubled, extending to Skipton by 1853. However, Morecambe-to-Lancaster remained single track until 1877, and Lancaster-to-Hornby until 1889. The curve between the two Lancaster stations was never doubled.

From 1 June 1852, the NWR was worked by the Midland Railway (MR). Later, on 1 January 1859, both the NWR and the MH&R were leased to the MR, and on 30 July 1874 the NWR was absorbed by the MR.

Connecting lines

The Ingleton Branch

After considerable manoeuvring between rival companies, in 1857 it was the Lancaster and Carlisle Railway, worked by the London and North Western Railway (LNWR), that was authorised to take over construction of the abandoned Ingleton-to-Low Gill line. The line opened to passengers on 16 September 1861, but to the LNWR's own station at Ingleton. The Midland and LNWR stations were at opposite ends of a viaduct, and passengers had to walk between them. However, by 1862 the LNWR trains ran through to the Midland station.

The Settle-Carlisle Line

Thus the NWR line between Skipton and  gained main line status. Even today, the line is occasionally used for inter-city diversions.

Other connecting lines
The line opened to passengers on 6 June 1867.

The Lancaster and Carlisle Railway also built a branch from Hest Bank on its main line to meet the NWR just before Morecambe station, opening on 13 August 1864.

Extension to Heysham

Heysham Harbour was opened by the Midland Railway in 1904, to replace the same company's harbour in Morecambe. A branch line from the NWR line had already opened for contractors on 12 November 1898 but was opened to passengers on 1 September 1904. The new line made a triangular junction with the existing NWR line a very short distance east of the junction with the LNWR line from Hest Bank.

Electrification

The line between Lancaster, Morecambe and Heysham pioneered the use of overhead cables for electrification. The system used 6.6 kV at 25 Hz, with the electricity provided by a power station at Heysham, supplied via cables suspended from overhead steel archways.

After 11 February 1951, steam trains temporarily took over while the system was upgraded to 6.6 kV at 50 Hz. Full electric service resumed on 17 August 1953, with power supplied from a new substation at Green Ayre. On a  section of track, the overhead arches were replaced by experimental cantilever structures, separate for each of the two tracks.

Closures

The Ingleton Branch closed to passengers on 30 January 1954, but was still used for goods and occasional excursions until closure on 26 July 1966, after which the tracks were lifted.

The Wennington-to-Morecambe section of the line was closed under the Beeching Axe. Passenger traffic ceased on 2 January 1966.

Goods traffic via the Lune Valley line ceased on 4 June 1967, except for a short single-track spur from the Heysham line towards Lancaster which closed on 31 January 1970, and another single-track spur from Lancaster Castle to a power station which closed on 16 March 1976.

Almost all of the route of the dismantled line between Caton and Morecambe has been preserved as a combined cyclepath and footpath, except for a short section near Lancaster city centre. Here the line's Greyhound Bridge over the River Lune was converted for use as a road bridge.

The Morecambe-to-Heysham branch closed to passengers on 4 October 1975, but reopened on 11 May 1987 for sailings to the Isle of Man. The branch has been single track since Morecambe station was relocated in 1994. The branch now connects only to platform 2.

References

Notes

Sources

External links

 RAILSCOT: North Western Railway

Midland Railway
Early British railway companies
Rail transport in North Yorkshire
Rail transport in Lancashire
History of North Yorkshire
Historic transport in Lancashire
Craven District
History of Lancaster
Railway companies established in 1846
Railway lines opened in 1849
Railway companies disestablished in 1871
1849 establishments in England
Transport in the City of Lancaster
British companies established in 1846
British companies disestablished in 1871